Jiří Načeradský (9 September 1939 – 16 April 2014) was a Czech painter, graphic artist and educator. He was best known for his human figures, sometimes with erotic and sexual subtext and context. He was born in Sedlec-Prčice, Příbram District, Czechoslovakia.

Načeradský died on 16 April 2014 in Prague, Czech Republic, aged 74.

References

External links
 
 Jiří Načeradský at Databáze Národní knihovny ČR 

1939 births
2014 deaths
Czech educators
Czech male painters
20th-century Czech painters
20th-century Czech male artists